Michael Alram (born 1956) is an Austrian historian and a numismatist. He obtained his doctorate in the University of Vienna in 1982, in Ancient Numismatics and Classical Archaeology.

He has been Director of the Vienna Coin Cabinet at the Kunsthistorisches Museum since 1982. He is also a member of the Numismatic Commission of the Austrian Academy of Science.

Works
 
 
 
 
 
 Michael Alram, “Indo-Parthian and early Kushan chronology: the numismatic evidence,” in Coins, Art, and Chronology: Essays on the Pre-Islamic History of the Indo-Iranian Borderlands, eds.

References

20th-century Austrian historians
Austrian numismatists
1956 births
Living people
University of Vienna alumni
21st-century Austrian historians